Jamu Dreaming is the second studio album by Australian singer song writer Archie Roach. The album was released in May 1993 and peaked at number 55 on the ARIA Charts. The album was recorded with musical assistance from David Bridie, Tiddas, Paul Kelly, Vika and Linda Bull, Ruby Hunter, Dave Arden and Joe Geia.

At the ARIA Music Awards of 1994, the album was nominated for Best Indigenous Release.

Reception

Bob Townsend from No Depression said the album is "a more hopeful celebration of his ancestry and search for justice" than his debut.
David Gulliver commented on the material range from songs of domestic violence, the wonder that comes from being a father and simple domestic happiness. Gulliver said "Musically, Jamu Dreaming relies on simple beauty, not catchy choruses. Archie is no great tunesmith, so he relies on the power of his voice and his lyrics to keep the listener captivated. His voice is most impressive on the slower songs, where he can let his voice breathe in the simple piano arrangement." adding "Archie's lyrics are unashamedly from the heart, and in his homilies to family life, it is his sheer honesty that prevents the listener from cringing."

Track listing

Charts

Release history

References

1993 albums
Archie Roach albums
Mushroom Records albums